The 1929 Buffalo Bisons season was their ninth and final season in the league. The team marginally improved on their previous output of 0–5, winning one game. They finished tenth in the league.

After suspending operations halfway through the 1927 season, the Buffalo Bisons, name intact, returned for what turned out to be a farewell season, with Al Jolley (a former player for the Oorang Indians) taking over as head coach. Jolley's dubious trademark was his teams' lack of offensive production; the Bisons never scored more than 7 points in the entire season (they had been shut out thrice) until their final game, a 19–7 win over the Chicago Bears (ironically, the very team that had robbed them of a league title at the peak of the team's success in 1921). In their first seven games, the Bisons never led during regulation, holding this dubious feat until the 2012 Kansas City Chiefs broke the record at eight games during regulation. This was, however, still an improvement from their 1927 season, when the team failed to score any points in all but one of their games.

The still-struggling Bisons franchise was folded at the end of a 1–7–1 season. Though the league flirted with returning to Buffalo in the late 1930s and again in 1950, it did not do so until the AFL–NFL merger in 1970, which added the Buffalo Bills to the league.

Jolley went on to coach the Cincinnati Reds in 1933; true to form, Jolley's Reds set a record for fewest points scored per game in a season (3.8) in the modern era (which did not begin until 1932).

Schedule

Standings

References

Buffalo Bisons (NFL) seasons
Buffalo Bisons
Buffalo